Benelux Algorithm Programming Contest (BAPC) is a programming contest for students from Belgium, the Netherlands, and Luxembourg. It is organized annually by an institution of higher education. From 1991 through 2004, the contest was held under the name NKP (Dutch Programming Championship).

Organisation 
Since 2006, BAPC is an official preliminary of NWERC (North Western European Regional Contest), organized by the ACM (Association for Computing Machinery). In practice, this means the participating institutions determine which teams they will send to NWERC based on the results at BAPC. The top teams of NWERC (typically the top two or the top three), are invited to take part in the ACM-ICPC World Finals.

A month before BAPC, a preliminary round is held to determine which teams are allowed to represent their institution at BAPC.

Besides the student ranking, there is a ranking for companies. However, the contest is the same for all participants.

Contest format 
A team consists of, at most, three people and has five hours to solve a set of six to ten problems. During the contest, each team is only allowed to use a single computer. The problems are algorithmic in nature and of varying degree of difficulty.

Judging 
Solutions to a problem, in the form of computer programs, can be submitted more than once. The BAPC jury checks whether a submission satisfies certain criteria and replies with a simple verdict. In case the submitted program gives the correct answer to all predefined tests within the allotted time, the response will be Accepted or Correct.

If a program requires too much time to pass all tests, the jury will reply Time Limit Exceeded. If it terminates with an error, the response will be Runtime Error, and if the program terminates correctly, but doesn't pass all tests, the reply will be Wrong Answer or Incorrect. Under no circumstances will the jury give hints as to what caused the error, which tests failed, or where the Bug is.

Scoring 
For each solved problem, one point is awarded. For each point scored within the first four hours of the contest, a helium balloon is attached to the team's computer. After four hours, the scoreboard is no longer updated, so that it remains a secret who won until the award ceremony.

Ties are solved by a time penalty (the lower, the better). Every team starts out with a penalty time of 0 minutes. For every solved problem, the time from the start of the contest until the correct submission in minutes is added to the time penalty. For every prior wrong submission for a solved problem, 20 minutes are added. Wrong submissions for problems that are not eventually solved do not affect the a team's score.

Prizes 

The prizes for the top three teams are typically a power of two. In 2008, for example, the prizes for the first, second, and third student teams were 1024, 512, and 256 euro respectively. The best company team received 512 euro. Participation costs for companies were 500 euro per team, while participation for student teams was free.

History 

In 1997, the company team Bolesian (Victor Allis, Seppo Pieterse, and Paul-Erik Raué) defeated all student teams and was crowned Dutch Champion.
In 1998, the company team Quintiq (Victor Allis, Seppo Pieterse and Paul-Erik Raué) defeated all student teams, but the best student team was declared the official winner.
In 2020, the contest was held online due to governmental regulations regarding the COVID-19 pandemic

References

External links
 Website BAPC
 CHipCie archief
 ACM-ICPC website

Programming contests